This is a list of the heads of state of Pakistan, from the foundation of Pakistan in 1947 to the present day. The current head of state of Pakistan is Arif Alvi, elected in 2018 after being nominated by PTI, the party run by Prime Minister Imran Khan.

From 1947 to 1956 the head of state  was the Pakistani monarch, who was the same person as the monarch of the United Kingdom and the other Commonwealth realms. The Monarch was represented in Pakistan by the Governor-General. Pakistan became a republic under the Constitution of 1956 and the Monarch and Governor-General were replaced by a ceremonial President.

Monarchy (1947–1956)

The succession to the throne of Pakistan was the same as the succession to the British throne.

Governors-General

The Governor-General was the representative of the monarch in Pakistan and exercised most of the powers of the monarch. The Governor-General was appointed for an indefinite term, serving at the pleasure of the monarch. After the passage of the Statute of Westminster 1931, the Governor-General was appointed solely on the advice of the Cabinet of Pakistan without the involvement of the British government. In the event of a vacancy the Chief Justice served as Officer Administering the Government.

Republic (1956–present)
Under the 1956 Constitution, the first constitution of the Republic of Pakistan, the President replaced the monarch as ceremonial head of state. The President was elected by the Electoral College for a five-year term. In the event of a vacancy the Speaker of the National Assembly served as Acting President.

List of presidents of Pakistan

See also
 Constitution of Pakistan of 1956
 Constitution of Pakistan of 1962
 Governor-General of Pakistan
 History of Pakistan
 List international trips made by the President of Pakistan
 List of prime ministers of Pakistan
 Military coups in Pakistan 
 Political history of Pakistan
 Politics of Pakistan
 Vice President of Pakistan

Notes

References

External links
 World Statesmen – Pakistan
 Rulers.org – Pakistan

Heads of state of Pakistan
H